This is a list of amphibians of Canada.

Conservation status - IUCN Red List of Threatened Species:
 - Extinct,  - Extinct in the Wild
 - Critically Endangered,  - Endangered,  - Vulnerable
 - Near Threatened,  - Least Concern
 - Data Deficient,  - Not Evaluated
(v. 2013.2, the data is current as of March 5, 2014)

Summary of 2006 IUCN Red List categories.

Order Caudata, salamanders

Genus Aneides
Wandering salamander – Aneides vagrans

Genus Ambystoma
Jefferson salamander – Ambystoma jeffersonianum 
Northwestern salamander – Ambystoma gracile 
Blue-spotted salamander – Ambystoma laterale 
Spotted salamander – Ambystoma maculatum 
Long-toed salamander – Ambystoma macrodactylum 
Barred tiger salamander – Ambystoma mavortium
Small-mouth salamander – Ambystoma texanum 
Tiger salamander – Ambystoma tigrinum

Genus Desmognathus
Dusky salamander – Desmognathus fuscus 
Allegheny Mountain dusky salamander – Desmognathus ochrophaeus

Genus Dicamptodon
Coastal giant salamander – Dicamptodon tenebrosus

Genus Ensatina
Ensatina – Ensatina eschscholtzii

Genus Eurycea
Northern two-lined salamander – Eurycea bislineata

Genus Gyrinophilus
Spring salamander – Gyrinophilus porphyriticus

Genus Hemidactylium
Four-toed salamander – Hemidactylium scutatum

Genus Necturus
Common mudpuppy – Necturus maculosus

Genus Notophthalmus
Eastern newt – Notophthalmus viridescens

Genus Plethodon
Red-backed salamander – Plethodon cinereus 
Coeur d’Alene salamander – Plethodon idahoensis 
Western redback salamander – Plethodon vehiculum

Genus Taricha
Rough-skinned newt – Taricha granulosa

Order Anura, frogs and toads

Genus Acris
Blanchard's cricket frog – Acris crepitans blanchardi

Genus Ascaphus
Coastal tailed frog – Ascaphus truei 
Rocky Mountain tailed frog – Ascaphus montanus

Genus Bufo or Anaxyrus
American toad – Anaxyrus americanus 
Western toad – Anaxyrus boreas 
Great Plains toad – Anaxyrus cognatus 
Fowler's toad – Anaxyrus fowleri 
Canadian toad – Anaxyrus hemiophrys

Genus Hyla
Cope's gray treefrog – Hyla chrysoscelis  
Gray treefrog – Hyla versicolor

Genus Rana
Northern red-legged frog – Rana aurora 
 Cascades frog – Rana cascadae 
Columbia spotted frog – Rana luteiventris 
Oregon spotted frog – Rana pretiosa

Genus Lithobates
American bullfrog – Lithobates catesbeianus 
Northern green frog – Lithobates clamitans 
Pickerel frog – Lithobates palustris 
Northern leopard frog – Lithobates pipiens 
Mink frog – Lithobates septentrionalis 
Wood frog – Lithobates sylvaticus

Genus Pseudacris
Spring peeper – Pseudacris crucifer 
Boreal chorus frog – Pseudacris maculata 
Pacific tree frog – Pseudacris regilla 
Western chorus frog – Pseudacris triseriata

Genus Spea
Plains spadefoot toad – Spea bombifrons 
Great Basin spadefoot – Spea intermontana

References

Checklist of the Amphibians and Reptiles of British Columbia, Source: Matsuda, Green and Gregory (The Amphibians and Reptiles of British Columbia)
Amphibians & Reptiles of Canada, CARCNET - RÉCCAR
Amphibians Species of Canada, Amphibians Canada

 
amphibians
Canada
Canada